Bertagnolli is a surname. Notable people with the name include:

 Giacomo Bertagnolli (born 1999), Italian alpine skier
 Júlio Sérgio Bertagnolli (born 1978), Brazilian football manager and player
 Leonardo Bertagnolli (born 1978), Italian road bicycle racer
 Libero Bertagnolli (1914–1992), American football player and coach
 Monica Bertagnolli (born 1959), American surgical oncologists